Geranoaetus is a genus of birds of prey in the family Accipitridae. It contains these species: Geranoaetus are huge birds. There wing span is about 70-80 in and there total length is 25-30 in.

References

External links

 
Bird genera

Higher-level bird taxa restricted to the Neotropics